A justice ministry, ministry of justice, or department of justice is a ministry or other government agency in charge of the administration of justice. The ministry or department is often headed by a minister of justice (called minister for justice in only very few countries) or secretary of justice. In countries where this agency is called a department (usually department of justice, sometimes attorney general's department) the head of the department is entitled attorney general, for example in the United States. Some countries have a solicitor general.

Specific duties may relate to organizing the justice system, overseeing the public prosecutor and maintaining the legal system and public order. Some ministries have additional responsibilities in related policy areas overseeing elections, directing the police, law reform. The duties of the ministry of justice may in some countries be split from separate responsibilities of an attorney general (often responsible for the justice system) and the interior minister (often responsible for public order). Sometimes the prison system is separated into another government department called Corrective Services. 

 when Adriana Olguín was appointed by the Chilean government to be justice minister. She was also the first female minister in Latin America.

Sovereign states

Italics denotes an acting justice minister and of extinct states

Dependent territories, constituent states, autonomous regions, and supra-national unions 

Italics denotes an acting justice minister and of defunct states/territories/regions

See also
Law
Judiciary
Justice ministry
List of female state attorneys general in the United States

References

Justice
Justice ministers

justice ministers